RLSY College, Anisabad also known as Ram Lakhan Singh Yadav College, Anisabad is a degree college in Patna district of Bihar, India. The college offers senior secondary education and undergraduate degrees in arts and sciences, and conducts some vocational courses. It is affiliated with Patliputra University.

History 
The college was established in 1979 by Ram Lakhan Singh Yadav. It became affiliated with Patliputra University in 2018.

Degrees and courses 
The college offers the following degrees and courses.

 Senior Secondary
 Intermediate of Arts
 Intermediate of Science
 Intermediate of Commerce 
 Bachelor's degree
 Bachelor of Arts
 Bachelor of Science

References 

Colleges affiliated to Patliputra University
1975 establishments in Bihar
Educational institutions established in 1975
Patna district